Abu Mahdi missile, complete name: "Shahid (Martyr) Abu-Mahdi al-Muhandis missile", is an Iranian naval cruise missile which was made by Ministry of Defense of Iran; This  missile has a range of over 1000 km. Abu-Mahdi (missile) whose name has been retrieved from Abu Mahdi al-Muhandis, was simultaneously unveiled with Haj-Qasem Soleimani missile on 20 August 2020. This missile is capable to be launched by diverse types of sea, land and air platforms towards the targets of it.

Among the most significant features of Abu-Mahdi missile is related to its range which has been increased triple in comparison with the strongest Iran-made naval cruise missile that means: before the unveiling of Abu-Mahdi, the most long-range Iranian cruise missiles were consisted of "Raad missile" with a range of 350 km and "Qadir missile" whose range is 300 kilometres.

It has been reported (by Tasnim Agency) that this missile is similar to the Hoveyzeh missile in appearance. The engine which has been used in the "Abu-Mahdi missile" is a turbojet-engine which is among the family of Tolou' (طلوع), that possesses a long history of operation in "Karar drones" and cruise missiles of the family of "Noor, Qader and Qadir". On the other hand, possessing the capability to control the thrust of this kind of engine, the type of its wings and having the necessary fuel that is placed in the larger body of the new cruise missile, have made this Iranian missile to be able to fly at different speed ranges.

See also 
 Haj Qasem (missile)
 Ministry of Defence and Armed Forces Logistics (Iran)
 Hoveyzeh (cruise missile)
 Noor (missile)
 Qader (missile)
 Ghadir (missile)
 Nasir (missile)
 Zafar (anti-ship missile)
 Nasr-e Basir

References 

Anti-ship missiles of Iran
Military equipment of Iran
Cruise missiles of Iran
Guided missiles of Iran